Allium chrysonemum is a species of onions native the Sierra de Cazorla mountain range in southeastern Spain.

References

chrysonemum
Onions
Flora of Spain
Plants described in 1978